Braxton Jones (born March 27, 1999) is an American football offensive tackle for the Chicago Bears of the National Football League (NFL). He played college football at Southern Utah.

Early life and high school
Jones grew up in Murray, Utah and attended Murray High School, where he played basketball and football.

College career
Jones played in two games as a true freshman before suffering a thumb injury against Stephen F. Austin and redshirting the remainder of the season. Jones became a starter as a redshirt sophomore and was named third-team All-Big Sky Conference. He started four games at left tackle during his redshirt junior season, which was shortened and played in the spring of 2021 due to the COVID-19 pandemic in the United States, and was named first-team all-conference. Jones repeated as a first-team All-Big Sky selection in 2021. During the season, Jones received an invitation to play in the Senior Bowl.

Professional career
Jones was drafted by the Chicago Bears with the 168th pick in the fifth round of the 2022 NFL Draft.  Jones started in all 17 games for the Bears. Pro Football Focus (PFF) named Jones to their 2022 All-Rookie Team following the regular season.

References

External links 
 Chicago Bears bio
Southern Utah Thunderbirds bio

1999 births
Living people
People from Murray, Utah
American football offensive tackles
Players of American football from Utah
Southern Utah Thunderbirds football players
Chicago Bears players